The Wall Live was a worldwide concert tour by Roger Waters, formerly of Pink Floyd. The tour is the first time the Pink Floyd album The Wall has been performed in its entirety by the band or any of its former members since Waters performed the album live in Berlin 21 July 1990. The first leg of the tour grossed in North America over $89.5 million from 56 concerts. It was the second-highest-grossing concert tour in North America in 2010 and the third-highest-grossing concert tour worldwide as of 2013. In 2013, the tour held the record for being the highest-grossing tour for a solo musician, surpassing the previous record holder, Madonna (the record was later eclipsed by Ed Sheeran). It is currently the 7th highest-grossing tour of all-time.

The tour opened on 15 September 2010 in Toronto, and moved through North America before ending the first leg of the tour in Mexico City, 21 December 2010. The European tour began 21 March 2011 in Lisbon, Portugal, and ended 12 July 2011 in Athens, Greece.  In 2012, the tour included Australia, New Zealand, and South America, resuming 27 January in Perth, and ending 1 April 2012 in São Paulo. It was confirmed by Waters during an interview with Jimmy Fallon that he would be returning to North America for yet another leg of The Wall tour, beginning 27 April 2012 in Mexico City and ending 21 July 2012 in Quebec City on the Plains of Abraham, a former battlefield. This last show in Quebec City was the second largest outdoor production of "The Wall" ever – the largest being the Live in Berlin show in 1990. The tour returned to European stadiums again in summer 2013. After the 21 September 2013 Paris show he claimed on stage this to be possibly the last The Wall show, confirming rumours that there will be no further tour dates planned for 2014. Waters, a pacifist, incorporated an increased emphasis on the show's anti-war message, and he requested fans to send him pictures of loved ones who have died as a result of wars.

Snowy White (who was a session and tour musician with Pink Floyd in the 1970s, and was in the tour band for the original 1980–81 tour for The Wall) and Dave Kilminster were the first musicians confirmed to be in Waters's touring band. Kipp Lennon, Mark Lennon and Michael Lennon of the band Venice were confirmed for backing vocal duties, but Michael Lennon withdrew from the band due to rehearsal difficulties. He was replaced by cousin Pat Lennon, also of Venice. On 23 April, the full band line-up was announced on Roger Waters's Facebook page. Following a charity gig Waters performed with his former Pink Floyd bandmates on 10 July 2010, he confirmed that David Gilmour would guest on "Comfortably Numb" at one show during the tour. Gilmour appeared at the 12 May 2011 show at The O2, London playing lead guitar on "Comfortably Numb" and mandolin on "Outside the Wall", on which they were also joined by Nick Mason on tambourine.

On 24 August 2010, The Times Leader newspaper of Wilkes-Barre, Pennsylvania, reported that Waters and company were in town rehearsing for the tour at the Mohegan Sun Arena. This venue previously hosted pre-tour rehearsals and pre-tour concerts for such performers as Elton John, the Simon & Garfunkel "Old Friends" Reunion Tour in 2003 and AC/DC rehearsals in 2008 before the band's world tour. There were no rehearsals or performances; the crew used the occasion to work out technical details. On 12 September 2010, there was a rehearsal performance at the Izod Center in East Rutherford, New Jersey, for invited guests.

In 2014 Waters directed a documentary about the tour titled Roger Waters: The Wall. The film incorporated footage from the concerts in Quebec City and Athens. It premiered in the Special Presentations section of the 2014 Toronto International Film Festival.

Tour band

The following musicians have played on the tour:
Roger Waters – bass, lead vocals, acoustic guitar, trumpet on "Outside the Wall"
G. E. Smith – guitars, bass, mandolin on "Outside the Wall"
Dave Kilminster – guitars, banjo on "Outside the Wall", bass on "Mother"
Snowy White – guitars, bass on "Goodbye Blue Sky"
Graham Broad – drums, percussion, ukulele on "Outside the Wall"
Jon Carin – keyboards, lap steel guitar, programming, high-strung guitar on "Comfortably Numb", acoustic guitar on "Outside The Wall", electric guitar on "Run Like Hell", "Bring The Boys Back Home", "Comfortably Numb" and "Brick 3"
Harry Waters – Hammond organ, keyboards, accordion on "Outside the Wall"
Robbie Wyckoff – lead vocals (songs or parts of songs originally sung by David Gilmour), backing vocals, percussion
Jon Joyce – backing vocals, percussion
Kipp Lennon – backing vocals, percussion
Mark Lennon – backing vocals, percussion
Pat Lennon – backing vocals, percussion

with:
David Gilmour – guest vocals, guitar and mandolin at Waters' London O2 show, 12 May 2011.
Nick Mason – guest tambourine at Waters' London O2 show, 12 May 2011.

Concert overview

Pre-show

During the pre-show, in the American part of the tour, a man who appears to be homeless pushes a shopping cart around the aisles around the floor seats. He wears a flannel jacket and a cowboy hat, and makes small talk with the fans as he makes his way around the floor. His cart is full of empty soda cans and rubbish and a sign that reads different sayings that vary from show to show, including, "No thought control" on one side and, "Homeless people need money for booze and hookers" on the other. His cart also contains the original stuffed "Pink" doll from 1979.

The pre-show audio was 20 minutes of several clips from television sitcoms and cartoons like Family Guy as well as comedy routines from George Carlin. After the first leg of the North American tour, the sound collage was dropped and replaced with 20 minutes of music in the following order and has been the same for every show since, "Mother" by John Lennon, "Masters of War" by Bob Dylan, "A Change Is Gonna Come" by Sam Cooke, "Imagine" by John Lennon, "Strange Fruit" by Billie Holiday, and "People Get Ready" by The Impressions.

The show
During the homeless man's tour through the crowd, the pre-show music stops and the sounds of channel surfing can be heard. When the homeless man reaches the stage, the climax of the movie Spartacus is played. A spotlight shines on him and his cart as the sounds of the slaves each claiming to be Spartacus are heard. After which, the man throws "Pink" onto the stage.

For the European shows and all shows thereafter, the homeless man was replaced with two "soldiers", bearing the crossed hammer uniform, who bring the "Pink" puppet onto the stage and hold him throughout the Spartacus clip, before dumping him on the ground and marching off the stage.

As he does this, the audio transitions to a trumpet (later revealed to be Roger Waters) playing the melody of "Outside the Wall". The trumpet playing continues unaccompanied for about a minute, until the band (unseen) unexpectedly bursts into action with "In the Flesh?". Fireworks explode across the stage during the opening chords and stage hands with 'marching hammers' arm bands and flags rise up above the band on lifts. Around mid-song, Waters emerges from the back of the stage, dressed in black. During the climax of the song, a scaled down Stuka Dive Bomber, suspended by a guide wire, flies into the wall and explodes. During "The Happiest Days of Our Lives" and "Another Brick in the Wall (Part 2)" there is a giant inflated puppet schoolmaster, an icon from the original show. Local school children are brought out onto the stage to lip-sync and dance. From the Berlin 16 June show onwards, Waters sings an acoustic reprise of "Another Brick in the Wall (Part 2)" with lyrics referring to the killing of Jean Charles de Menezes before finally greeting the audience and telling them about the filming of the original Wall Tour shows. He then sings "Mother" to a video of him playing the song from the original 1980 tour. He refers to the video as "miserable little Roger." A giant mother blow-up designed on the look of the animated version is featured as well. The song has more of a political message than before, the words "Big Brother Is Watching You" are written on the wall, with the "Br" crossed off and replaced with an "M". After the line "Mother, should I trust the government?" the words "No fucking way" are projected on the wall, as well as a local translation in non-English speaking countries.

The initial projections shown during "Goodbye Blue Sky" caused some controversy. During the song, aeroplanes are shown dropping bombs shaped like Latin crosses, hammer and sickles, dollar signs, star and crescents, Stars of David, the Shell logo, and the Mercedes-Benz logo, with the addition of the McDonald's logo in later shows. The plane dropping dollar signs appeared directly after the plane dropping the Star of David. Although Waters said in Rolling Stone that there was no relevance to the order of the bombs, he changed the order after Abraham Foxman, president of the Anti-Defamation League, complained. Waters stated, "Contrary to Mr Foxman's assertion, there are no hidden meanings in the order or juxtaposition of these symbols." These visuals were changed at Waters' request for all future shows, to avoid any sensitive juxtapositions of the symbols used in the video. At the first show of the tour, while these symbols dropped from the plane they also dropped from the ceiling of the Air Canada Centre in little cut-out shapes of confetti. During the song "Don't Leave Me Now" the production features a giant wife puppet similar in design and execution as the Schoolmaster. During the first half on the show, the wall is slowly built up brick by brick and as with the eighties tour, an instrumental called "The Last Few Bricks" that doesn't appear on the original album is played to give the stage hands extra time to build the wall. At the end of "Goodbye Cruel World", the last brick is put in place and the wall is completed across the stage. An intermission follows with photos and short bios of people lost in conflicts are projected on the wall.

The second act begins with "Hey You" and is played with minimal visuals on the wall. The band performs, now hidden from the audience's view, from behind the wall. For the acoustic guitar solo piece "Is There Anybody Out There?" a brick is removed so that guitarists Dave Kilminster and G.E. Smith are visible. As "Nobody Home" begins, a section folds out of the wall revealing a small mock hotel room complete with a television, chair, lamp and unmade bed. Waters, in character as "Pink", sings the song while seated on a comfy chair that is on a platform extending from the wall. During "Vera" images of Vera Lynn are displayed on the wall, along with videos of young children being reunited with their veteran fathers. "Bring the Boys Back Home" features Dwight D. Eisenhower's American Society of Newspaper Editors speech. During "Comfortably Numb", Robbie Wyckoff and Dave Kilminster stand on top of the wall as David Gilmour did in the original tour – a performance reprised by Gilmour himself during a one-off appearance at the London O2 show on 12 May 2011. At the end of the song, the projection of the wall explodes and cinematic pillars rise.

The band plays "The Show Must Go On" dressed in black fascist attire complete with the Marching Hammers armbands. Waters' trademarked inflatable pig is released, untethered, during "In the Flesh", and guided by remote control, floats around the venue. Spotlights shine on the audience as Waters interrogates them, pointing out the "riff raff" in the room. Waters is projected onto the wall with a machine gun shooting the audience. During "Run Like Hell", images are displayed on the wall parodying the iPod lowercase "i" fad. Pictures of pigs are shown next to the words "iLead", dogs next to "iProtect", sheep next to "iFollow" (pigs, dogs, and sheep indicating their roles on the Pink Floyd album Animals), George W. Bush and other leaders next to "iBelieve", Hitler next to "iPaint", children next to "iLearn", and gravestones next to "iPay" among others. In all of the pictures, the subjects are wearing iPods. After this montage, the leaked footage from the 12 July 2007 Baghdad airstrike is played, displaying captions of the American pilots speaking and pointing out Reuters employees Saeed Chmagh and Namir Noor-Eldeen, whose cameras were mistaken for weapons; after the attack, a banner is projected onto the wall: "Namir Noor-Eldeen and Saeed Chmagh, We Will Remember You." A burst of gunfire sends it to the ground.

"Waiting for the Worms" features more of Gerald Scarfe's original animation from the film adaptation and tour, except that the infamous sequence of marching hammers has now been replaced with a new computer-generated, cel-shaded version. "Stop" abruptly blacks out the entire wall, with a lone spotlight shining upon the Pink doll from the beginning of the program, which is sitting atop the wall; it is then thrown off its high perch to the ground.

Gerald Scarfe's animated sequence is displayed during "The Trial". As the song reaches its steady climax and with the crowd shouting "Tear down the Wall", the wall crumbles violently from the top down amid smoke while a flurry of red paper confetti (in the shape of the bomb symbols from earlier in the show) drops onto the audience. The band emerges from behind the rubble and plays "Outside the Wall" with a variety of acoustic instruments. (At certain shows on the Australian leg, the band plays a complete acoustic version of "Waltzing Matilda" immediately after "Outside the Wall" as a rare encore. Similarly, at the shows in Mexico, the band performed "Las Mañanitas" to the tune of "Another Brick in the Wall") Waters introduces the band to the crowd, they bow and then exit the stage.

Critical reception 

Kevin Coffey of the Omaha World-Herald wrote:
Roger Waters and a cast of supporting musicians ... perform[ed] from start to finish one of the most commercially successful, beloved and ambitious art-rock albums in history ... as the show begins, the famous and enormous white wall is erected on stage, brick by brick, until it obscures the band and becomes a screen upon which a dazzling array of videos and visuals are projected. Technically, this was a nearly flawless show. The sound was clean and true. The original album and tour was about isolation. This time around, it was more anti-war, anti-capitalism and anti-poverty than about any kind of psychological issue. In addition to wild and slightly creepy animations from Gerald Scarfe, projections on the wall and video screens showed images of poverty, soldiers and others who died in conflicts as well as video of planes bombing areas with crosses, dollar signs, Shell Oil logos and others.

J.C. Maçek III of PopMatters wrote:
As an immersive concert experience, however, The Wall is an entirely different beast. Its harsh, theatrical nature pulls the audience deep into its storyline and its visuals create the illusion of actually being inside a dynamic, frightening and engrossing movie. Yes, The Wall live is every bit as cinematic as its actual cinema-released counterpart film Pink Floyd – The Wall and will remain a milestone in Pink Floyd and Roger Waters history. The Wall Live has truly been more than a concert tour, but an anti-war, pro-music, theatrical, cinematic, brilliant, inspiring truly immersive, multi-media experience that complements the history of The Wall and, perhaps, brings it one step farther in its story.

Steve Pick of Stltoday.com said:
"Roger Waters did not put on just an ordinary concert Friday night at the Scottrade Center — he created a huge, technologically complex and metaphorically dense theatrical spectacle."

Timothy Fin of the Kansas City Star has this to say about the show:
 " ... Waters accordingly turned the performance into a[n] epic, gaudy and extravagant piece of theatre – an onslaught of sights, sounds and socio-political themes. Some of it was poignant, some of it was bombastic, some of it was viscerally thrilling, like a great rock show ought to be. But all of it was entertaining."

Kevin Stevens of The Setonian stated:
A hail of firework explosions, hundreds of large rectangular bricks, crashing planes, enormous puppets, 3D effects. Surely, this is not your average concert. Roger Waters' tour of his seminal album, "The Wall", lavishes in this Broadway-esque pomp, but never compromises its music for theatrics.  This is a rock concert, one that succeeds in transforming Pink Floyd's brilliant 1979 opus into a compelling aesthetic and auditory experience.

A.D. Amorosi of the Philadelphia City Paper wrote:
"If epic paranoia over monster themes such as megalomania, mother fixation, loneliness, television, the warring industrial complex and the uselessness of fans and celebrity, accompanied by the sounds of unsettling bombast, is what you seek as entertainment, there's a bridge I can sell you. Or rather, a wall — The Wall, Roger Waters’ semi-autobiographical 1979 magnum opus ...

According to Matt DeMarco of The Hofstra Chronicle online:
Pyrotechnics were used throughout the show, as were massive marionette puppets, representative of several of the opera's supporting characters. The technological aspect of this show was astounding. Musically, the show was just as phenomenal. Waters brought an impressive touring band with him, including lead guitarist Dave Kilminster, who was just spectacular. The solo he delivered during "Comfortably Numb" was absolutely mind-blowing. Waters, himself, proved that rock ‘n roll has no age limit. At 67 years old, the rock icon played a flawless show, hitting notes that he was hitting 30 years ago. His energy was visibly present; he was truly excited to be performing this album for a live crowd again.

Set list
The Wall album is played in its entirety and two songs not in the original release are included—"What Shall We Do Now?" and "The Last Few Bricks"—both of which were also played at every concert during The Wall Tour in 1980–1981, and documented on the album Is There Anybody Out There? The Wall Live 1980–81, released in 2000. "One of My Turns", "Don't Leave Me Now" and "Run Like Hell" are all transposed one key down to accommodate Waters' vocal range.

A change was made in the setlist from the Berlin 16 June 2011 show onwards, when Waters added an acoustic coda to "Another Brick in the Wall (Part 2)" with brand new lyrics referring to the murder of Jean Charles de Menezes. On later legs of the tour, the official tour program would list this as a separate song called "The Ballad of Jean Charles de Menezes". This is the first time ever a new song has been added to The Wall—all previous additions to the setlist of the original album either restored unused material (in The Wall film) or added existing songs from Waters' work (in The Wall – Live in Berlin).

Set one
 "In the Flesh?"
 "The Thin Ice"
 "Another Brick in the Wall (Part 1)"
 "The Happiest Days of Our Lives"
 "Another Brick in the Wall (Part 2)"
 "The Ballad of Jean Charles de Menezes" (June 2011 onwards)
 "Mother"
 "Goodbye Blue Sky"
 "Empty Spaces"
 "What Shall We Do Now?"
 "Young Lust"
 "One of My Turns"
 "Don't Leave Me Now"
 "Another Brick in the Wall (Part 3)"
 "The Last Few Bricks"
 "Goodbye Cruel World"

Set two
 "Hey You"
 "Is There Anybody Out There?"
 "Nobody Home"
 "Vera"
 "Bring the Boys Back Home"
 "Comfortably Numb"
 "The Show Must Go On"
 "In the Flesh"
 "Run Like Hell"
 "Waiting for the Worms"
 "Stop"
 "The Trial"
 "Outside the Wall"

Tour dates

Image gallery

See also 
 List of highest-grossing concert tours

References

Roger Waters concert tours
2010 concert tours
2011 concert tours
2012 concert tours
2013 concert tours
The Wall (rock opera)